Abell 223 is a galaxy cluster. It is located at a distance of 2.4 billion light-years from Earth.
The cluster is connected to nearby cluster Abell 222 by a filament of matter. Research has shown that only 20% of that matter is normal. The rest is thought to be dark matter. This means that this would form the Abell 222/ Abell 223 Supercluster as we understand them.

See also
Abell catalogue
List of Abell clusters

References

Galaxy clusters
0223
Cetus (constellation)